The 1986-87 Welsh Cup winners were Merthyr Tydfil. The final and replay were played at Ninian Park in Cardiff in front of attendances of 7,000 and 6,010 respectively.

Semi-finals – first leg

Semi-finals – second leg

Final

Replay

External links
Details of final

1986-87
Wales
Cup